10 Years Later or Ten Years Later may refer to:

 10 Years Later (song), a song by Collective Soul
 10 Years Later (TV series), a Georgian TV series
 The Vicomte of Bragelonne: Ten Years Later, a novel by Alexandre Dumas

See also 
 Ten Years After (disambiguation)